Hermlin is a surname. Notable people with the surname include:

Aarne Hermlin (1940–2007), Estonian chess player
Stephan Hermlin (1915–1997), German author

See also
Herlin